Jeffrey Heerema (born January 17, 1980) is a Canadian former professional ice hockey winger. He last played for the Nottingham Panthers of the EIHL. He was drafted in the first round, 11th overall, by the Carolina Hurricanes in the 1998 NHL Entry Draft. Prior to signing for the Nottingham club he most recently played for KHL Medveščak Zagreb in Croatia.

Playing career
After playing three full seasons in the Ontario Hockey League with the Sarnia Sting, Heerema made his professional debut with the Cincinnati Cyclones of the International Hockey League in the 2000–01 season. He made his National Hockey League debut in the 2002–03 season with the Hurricanes, appearing in ten games and scoring three goals.  He moved on to the St. Louis Blues for the 2003–04 season after being claimed off of waivers, and appeared in 22 games, scoring one goal.

Heerema spent the entire 2005–06  and 2006–07 seasons with the Binghamton Senators of the AHL, tallying 141 points in 155 games. He signed in the 2007 off-season with German team the Frankfurt Lions of the DEL. After scoring 20 goals in 2007–08 with the Lions, Heerema was given a one-year extension to remain in Frankfurt.

A free agent to start the 2009–10 season, Heerema signed with Croatian-based KHL Medveščak Zagreb of the Austrian Hockey League on 23 November 2009. Heerema established himself with the Bears scoring 24 points in 28 games before managing to score only 2 goals as KHL reached to semi-finals in the playoffs. On 13 August 2010, it was announced that Heerema was not offered a new contract to remain in Croatia. On 29 November 2010, it was announced that Heerema had signed for the Nottingham Panthers of the UK's Elite League. Heerema finished his first season with the Panther with 18 goals and 34 points in 28 games.

Heerema returned for a second season with the Nottingham Panthers.  He suffered a concussion and broken nose following a collision with teammate Matt Francis in Dundee where Panthers won the game 4-1.  Due to his injury, he missed the most of October. During the first leg of the Challenge Cup Semi Final in Braehead, Heerema suffered another broken nose and concussion on February 22, 2012. A week later, he returned to Canada to rest and rehabilitate.

Personal
Heerema is the cousin of Eric, Marc, Jordan and Jared Staal, all of whom have played professional hockey, and are of Dutch descent.

Career statistics

References

External links

1980 births
Binghamton Senators players
Canadian ice hockey right wingers
Carolina Hurricanes draft picks
Carolina Hurricanes players
Cincinnati Cyclones (IHL) players
Frankfurt Lions players
Hartford Wolf Pack players
Ice hockey people from Ontario
KHL Medveščak Zagreb players
Living people
Lowell Lock Monsters players
Manitoba Moose players
National Hockey League first-round draft picks
Nottingham Panthers players
St. Louis Blues players
Sarnia Sting players
Sportspeople from Thunder Bay
Worcester IceCats players